The Monegasque Cycling Federation or FMC (in French: Fédération Monégasque de Cyclisme) is the national governing body of cycle racing in Monaco.

The FMC is a member of the UCI and the UEC.

References

External links
 Monegasque Cycling Federation official website

National members of the European Cycling Union
Cycle racing organizations
Cycling
Cycle racing in Monaco